The 1985–86 FIS Ski Jumping World Cup was the seventh World Cup season in ski jumping. It began in Thunder Bay, Canada on 7 December 1985 and finished in Planica, Yugoslavia on 23 March 1986. The individual World Cup was won by Matti Nykänen and Nations Cup by Austria.

Map of world cup hosts 
All 19 locations which have been hosting world cup events for men this season.

 Four Hills Tournament
 Swiss Tournament
 Bohemia Tournament
 KOP International Ski Flying Week

Calendar

Men

Standings

Overall

Nations Cup

Four Hills Tournament

References 

World cup
World cup
FIS Ski Jumping World Cup